Wooden Nickel Records was an American independent record label started in 1971 by Bill Traut, Jim Golden and Jerry Weintraub as a successor to Dunwich Records. Most of Wooden Nickel's releases were by acts based in the Chicago area, including the Siegel–Schwall Band, James Lee Stanley, Megan McDonough and Styx. The label had a distribution deal with RCA Records. Wooden Nickel ceased operations after its top act, Styx, signed with A&M Records in 1975. The label sued the band for breach of contract, then was formally disbanded in 1977.

Discography

Albums: WNS-1000 series
WNS-1000 - Wooden Nickel - Wooden Nickel [1971]
WNS-1001 - String Cheese - String Cheese [1971] Produced by James Lee Golden and Barry Alan Fasman. Artists: Greg Block, Louis Constantino, William Dalton, John Maggi, Sally Smaller, and Lawrence W. Wendelken.
WNS-1002 - The Siegel-Schwall Band - Siegel-Schwall Band [1971] This album cover won a Grammy in 1972 for best album cover of the year. Produced by Bill Traut and Peter Szillies. Partly recorded live at the Quiet Knight, Chicago. 
WNS-1003 - David Patton - David Patton [1971] Produced by James Lee Golden. Country album with Larry Carlton, Larry Brown, Tom Hensley, Bill Perry, and Buddy Emmons. 
WNS-1004 - In the Megan Manner - Megan McDonough [1972] Produced by Bob Monaco, Jim Golden, and Barry Fasman. 
WNS-1005 - Buckeye - David Patton [1972] Country album with Buddy Emmons, Larry Carlton, Larry Brown, Bill Perry, Lincoln Mayorgo, Michael Lang, Gib Guilbeau, and others.
WNS-1006
WNS-1007 - Megan Music - Megan McDonough [1972]
WNS-1008 - Styx - Styx [1972] Produced by Bill Traut and John Ryan. Reissued in 1975 as BWL1-1008; reissued in 1978 as RCA AFL1-3110. Reissued in 1979 as Styx I on RCA AFL1-3593. Reissued in 1981 as Styx I on RCA AYL1-3888. 
WNS-1009 - Wolfman Jack - Wolfman Jack [1972] Reissued in 1975 as BWL1-1009. Produced by Don Sciarotta, of Quantum Productions.
WNS-1010 - Sleepy Hollow - Siegel-Schwall Band [1972]
WNS-1011 - James Lee Stanley - James Lee Stanley [1973] Produced by Barry Fasman and Jim Stanley. Musicians: Jim Stanley (acoustic & electric guitars, vocals), Gib Guilbeau (fiddle), Doug Dillard (banjo), Larry Carlton (electric guitar), John Jarvis (piano), Michael Omartian (piano, organ), Mark Tulin (bass), Don Dunn (background vocals), John Batdorf (background vocals), Mark Rodney (background vocals). 
WNS-1012 - Styx II - Styx [1973] (1-75, #20) Produced by John Ryan and Bill Traut. Reissued in 1975 as Wooden Nickel BWL1-1012. Reissued in 1979 as Lady on RCA AFL1-3594. Reissued in 1982 as Lady on RCA AYL1-4233.

Albums: RCA consolidated series
BWL1-0119 - Through the Ages - Wolfman Jack [1973]
BWL1-0120 - Exile - Exile [1973]
BWL1-0121 - 953 West - Siegel-Schwall Band [1973] 
BWL1-0145 - Keepsake - Megan McDonough [1973] With Larry Carlton, Michael Omartian, Jim Gordon and Jim Horn.
BWL1-0146 - James Lee Stanley, Too - James Lee Stanley [1973] 
BWL1-0287 - The Serpent Is Rising - Styx [1974] (2-74, #192) Reissued in 1979 as Serpent on RCA AFL1-3595, and in 1981 as Serpent on RCA AQL1-4111.
BWL1-0288 - Last Summer: The Siegel-Schwall Band Live - Siegel-Schwall Band [1974]
BWL1-0430 - Three's the Charm - James Lee Stanley [1974]
BWL1-0431 - Magic - Richie Lecéa [1974] 
BWL1-0499 - Sketches - Megan McDonough [1974]
BWL1-0554 - R.I.P. - Siegel-Schwall Band [1974] 
BWL1-0635 - Mo - Mo McGuire [1974]
BWL1-0638 - Man of Miracles - Styx [1974] (11-74, #154) Reissued in 1979 as Miracles on RCA AFL1-3596.
BWL1-0673 - It's All Done with Mirrors - Richie Lecéa [1975]
BWL1-0772 - Come Again - Jaggerz [1975]
BWL1-0790 - Schizoid - Boa [1975]
BWL1-0791 - Zazu - Zazu [1975] Produced by Zazu, Bill Trout, and Barry Mraz. 
BWL1-2250 - Best of Styx - Styx [1977] Reissued in 1979 as RCA AFL1-3597 with a different cover.

CD
Varèse Sarabande/Varèse Vintage VSD-6006 - The Very Best of the Siegel-Schwall Band: The Wooden Nickel Years (1971-1974) - Siegel-Schwall Band [1999]

Singles: 65 prefix series
Wooden Nickel singles, like the albums, started with their own numbering system, but in 1973 were put into the consolidated RCA numbering system where they shared a catalog numbering sequence with all of the RCA-distributed labels. The label design was the same as for the albums, that is, a brown, wood-like color with a buffalo nickel backdrop, and "wooden nickel" in white at the top of the label. Promotional records used the same design, with "NOT FOR SALE" printed on the label. Promo copies usually featured the same song on both sides, one mono and one stereo. The deejay numbers on the 65-0100 series were completely different (e.g., the promo issue of "Guitar Picker" was SP/SPS-45-314 vs. the commercial issue of 65-0105). The WB-10000 series deejay issues used the same numbers, but with a "JH-" prefix instead of "WB-". 
65-0100 - David Patton - The Devil In Me/You Are Gone [1971]
65-0101
65-0102 - Megan McDonough - Pocketful/Don't Worry Mama [1972]
65-0103 - David Patton - Her/Like Tonight [1972]
65-0104 - Siegel-Schwall Band - Always Thinking Of You Darling/Sleepy Hollow [1972]
65-0105 - Megan McDonough - Guitar Picker/Stay In Touch [1972]
65-0106 - Styx - Best Thing (9-72, #82)/What Has Come Between [1972]
65-0107 - David Patton - People In Dallas Go Hair/Los Angeles Leavin' [1972]
65-0108 - Wolfman Jack - I Ain't Never Seen A White Man (9-72, #106)/Gallop [1972]
65-0109 - Megan McDonough - Lady In Love/? [1972]
65-0110 - Wolfman Jack - There's An Old Man In Our Town/Hey Wolfman [1972]
65-0111 - Styx - I'm Gonna Make You Feel It/Quick Is The Beat Of My Heart [1972]
65-0112 - Megan McDonough - Broken Guitar/No Return
65-0113 - James Lee Stanley - Every Minute/I Knead You [1973]
65-0114 - Siegel-Schwall Band - Good Time Band/Hey Billy Jean [1973]
65-0115 - Exile - Devil's Bite/Mabel [1973]
65-0116 - Styx - Lady/You Better Ask [1973]
65-0117 - Wolfman Jack - Ling Ting Tong/Johnny Do It Faster [1973]
65-0118 - James Lee Stanley - Wishing Well/This Could Be Goodbye [1973]

Singles: RCA APB0 series
The series used four prefix characters, the first of which indicated if the single was on the RCA parent label (=A) or a subsidiary/distributed label (=B). The second letter indicated the label, with "W" indicating Wooden Nickel. The third letter was mostly "B" except for a few pop artists' reissues (=A). The final character was intended to always be a "0" (zero), but was often erroneously typeset as a capital O. Since several labels shared the sequence, the Wooden Nickel numbers are not continuous.
 
BWB0-0006 - Exile - Do What You Think You Should/Hold Tight Sweet Woman [1973]
BWB0-0032 - Megan McDonough - Daddy Always Liked A Lady/Wishing [1973]
BWB0-0065 - Styx - You Need Love/Winner Take All [1973]
BWB0-0066 - Siegel-Schwall Band - Old Time Shimmy/Blow Out The Candle [1973]
BWB0-0110 - Wolfman Jack - The Rapper/My Girl [1973]
BWB0-0137 - Megan McDonough - Love Comes And Love Goes/? [1974]
BWB0-0138 - James Lee Stanley - Afternoon Rain/Lydia [1974]
BWB0-0190 - Siegel-Schwall Band - I Think It Was The Wine/Traitor From Decatur [1974]
BWB0-0207 - Christopher - Henry's Highway/Get Me Goin' In The Right Direction [1974]
BWB0-0252 - Styx - Young Man/Unfinished Song [1974]
BWB0-0264 - Richie Lecea - Magic Is You/Season Of The Mist [1974]
BWB0-0322 - Mo McGuire - Mama Was A Cowgirl/Saturday Night In The Summertime [1974]

Singles: RCA "PB" series
RCA Consolidated numbering system changes to the PB-10000 sequence, with the letter prefixes pared down to the middle two letters of the four-letter combination above.
WB-10004 - James Lee Stanley - Plenty Of Reason/Windmill [1974]
WB-10027 - Styx - Lies/22 Years [1974]
WB-10043 - Richie Lecea - Season Of The Mist/Slowin' Down But Goin' Faster [1974]
WB-10101 - Mo McGuire - First Of May/Just About Over The Hill [1974]
WB-10102 - Styx - Lady (12-74, #6)/Children Of The Land (Short Version) [1974]
WB-10107 - Donny Mann - I'm A Weak Man/Try Me [1974]
WB-10193 - Boa - Crazy Days/Love Ranger [1975]
WB-10194 - Jaggerz - 2+2/Don't It Make You Want To Dance [1975]
WB-10272 - Styx - You Need Love (5-75, #88)/You Better Ask [1975]
WB-10329 - Styx - Best Thing/Havin' A Ball [1975]
GB-10492 - Styx - Lady/Children Of The Land [1975]
WB-11205 - Styx - Best Thing/Winner Take All [1978, Golden Standard Series]

Singles: promotional
SP/SPS-45-299 - Megan McDonough - Pocketful (mono)/Pocketful (stereo) [1972]
SP/SPS-45-314 - Megan McDonough - Guitar Picker (mono)/Guitar Picker (stereo) [1972]
SPS/SP-45-411 - Wolfman Jack - There's An Old Man In Our Town (stereo)/There's An Old Man In Our Town (mono) [1972]
SPS-45-442 - Styx - Father O.S.A./A Day [1972]
JH-10272 - Styx - You Need Love (stereo)/You Need Love (mono)

See also 
 List of record labels
 Styx: The Complete Wooden Nickel Recordings

References

Record labels established in 1971
Record labels disestablished in 1977
American independent record labels
RCA Records